The Heartland International Film Festival is a film festival held each October in Indianapolis, Indiana. The festival was first held in 1992, its goal is to "inspire filmmakers and audiences through the transformative power of film".

Grand Prize and Audience Choice Award-winning films

References

External links
Official website
Heartland Film

Film festivals in Indiana
Festivals in Indianapolis
Film festivals established in 1992
1992 establishments in Indiana
October events